Jaffa is a rural locality in the Cassowary Coast Region, Queensland, Australia.

History 
The locality takes its name from a former railway station, named on 24 March 1921 by the Queensland Railways Department after the Middle East city known to Australian troops from World War I, presumably reflecting the presence of a local soldier settlement.

References 

Cassowary Coast Region
Localities in Queensland